Richard Lioger is a French politician representing La République En Marche! He was elected to the French National Assembly on 18 June 2017, representing Moselle's 3rd constituency. He lost his seat in the first round of the 2022 French legislative election.

See also
 2017 French legislative election
 List of MPs who lost their seat in the 2022 French legislative election

References

Year of birth missing (living people)
Living people
Deputies of the 15th National Assembly of the French Fifth Republic
La République En Marche! politicians
Place of birth missing (living people)
1957 births
Members of Parliament for Moselle
21st-century French politicians